is the Japanese fifth tier of league football, which is part of the Japanese Regional Leagues. It covers the five prefectures of the Chūgoku region; Tottori, Shimane, Okayama, Hiroshima and Yamaguchi. It is one of the nine Japanese Regional Leagues, the fifth league level in the Japanese association football league system.

History
The league formed in 1973 with six teams from the Chūgoku region: Mazda Auto Hiroshima SC, Hiroshima Teachers, Mitsui Shipbuilding Soccer Club, Mitsubishi Oil, Mitsui Oil and Hitachi Works Kasado SC. The format was in a round-robin tournament with teams playing each other twice; once at home and once away. Winning teams earned two points, one point was given to each team in a draw, and losing teams earned no points. League position was determined by the number of points.

The following season, the number of teams increased to eight and generally stayed at that number for some time. However the Mitsui Oil team withdrew from the competition in 1975 because of an oil spill accident at their parent company, leaving the league with seven teams briefly. In the late 1980s, Kawasaki Seitetsu Mizushima SC and Mazda Auto Hiroshima SC achieved promotion to the then Japan Soccer League. Although Kawasaki Seitetsu Mizushima SC were able to avoid relegation back to the Chūgoku League, Mazda Auto Hiroshima SC were relegated the season following promotion twice.

In 1991 the league format changed, awarding three points for a league win, rather than just two.

From 1997 a penalty kick system was introduced so matches could be firmly decided instead of having a draw. If at the end of 90 minutes the game ends in a draw, a penalty shoot out is held. The winning team is awarded two points (instead of three) and the losing team is awarded one point (instead of zero).

In the 2000s, SC Tottori, Mitsubishi Motors Mizushima F.C. and Fagiano Okayama achieve promotion to the JFL.

From 2007 the penalty kick system ended, and standard regulation matches commenced. Teams played each other at home and away (each team would actually play 18 matches), and an appropriate method was decided in order to determine league placements should teams have the same number of points (highest goal difference, most goals for, the results of the respective teams matches). Based on those results, the top four teams would be split from the next four teams (5th to 8th). Teams would play in these smaller groups against each other once, meaning the final league result is based on 21 matches. Furthermore, this means that teams finishing 9th or 10th will not be able to have the chance at promotion after the initial 18 matches, should they situation arise.

Since 2008, the league has consisted of ten teams. In 2009, the two block split was abolished, and a traditional home and away league structure was introduced.

Regulations
Just like the JFL, matches last for two 45 minute halves with no extra time. Winning teams receive 3 points, drawing teams receive one point, and losing teams receive no points.

League winners earn the right to represent the Chūgoku region at the Regional League promotion series, with the aim of promotion to the JFL. Depending on the year, two or more teams may also be invited.

Participating teams

2023 season 
These are the ten participating teams, Eight teams stay and Two teams promoted from Prefectural Leaguea respectively from previous season:

FC Baleine Shimonoseki (Shimonoseki, Yamaguchi Prefecture)
Belugarosso Iwami (Hamada, Shimane Prefecture)
Fukuyama City FC (Fukuyama, Hiroshima Prefecture)
Hatsukaichi FC (Hatsukaichi, Hiroshima Prefecture)
International Pacific University FC (Okayama, Okayama Prefecture)
Mitsubishi Motors Mizushima F.C. (Kurashiki, Okayama Prefecture)
NTN Okayama Soccer Club (Bizen, Okayama Prefecture)
SRC Hiroshima (Hiroshima, Hiroshima Prefecture)
Vajra Okayama (Okayama, Okayama Prefecture)
Yonago Genki SC (Yonago, Tottori Prefecture)

Former clubs

Promotion and relegation

Promotion from the Chūgoku Soccer League
Basically, for the league champions to be promoted to a higher league, it is necessary to compete in a specified national tournament. Up until and including the 1976 season, the All Japan Senior Football Championship was used in which the winner and runner-up played off in a promotion and relegation series against the bottom two clubs of the JSL. However, from 1977 the Regional League promotion series became the tournament of choice. The following teams have achieved promotion from the Chūgoku Soccer League.

JSL 2 (1973 - 1991)
1985：Kawasaki Seitetsu Mizushima SC
1986：Mazda Auto Hiroshima SC (Relegated in 1987)
1988：Mazda Auto Hiroshima SC (Relegated in 1989)
JFL (1999–Present)
2000：SC Tottori
2004：Mitsubishi Motors Mizushima F.C.
2007：Fagiano Okayama
2013 : Fagiano Okayama Next, Renofa Yamaguchi F.C.

Promotion from Prefectural Leagues
The top two teams from each of the five prefectural leagues in the Chūgoku region meet in a promotional tournament. Teams are split into two blocks, with the block winners being promoted to the Chūgoku Soccer League. However, owing to which teams are promoted to and relegated from the JFL, there is a possibility that the number of promotions from the Prefectural leagues will change.

Relegation to the Prefectural Leagues
The two teams positioned 9th and 10th at the end of the season are relegated to their local Prefectural League.

Final league positions
Teams in blue participated in the National Promotional Tournament, with bold teams achieving promotion.

1973 to 1987

1988 to 2002

2003 onwards

Footnotes

See also
 Japanese association football league system
 Japanese Regional Leagues

External links
 Chugoku Soccer League

Sport in Tottori Prefecture
Sport in Shimane Prefecture
Sport in Okayama Prefecture
Sport in Hiroshima Prefecture
Sport in Yamaguchi Prefecture
Football leagues in Japan
Japanese Regional Leagues
Sports leagues established in 1973